Joseph Leslie Armstrong (27 December 1950 – 20 April 2019) was a computer scientist working in the area of fault-tolerant distributed systems.  He is best known as one of the co-designers of the Erlang programming language.

Early life and education
Armstrong was born in Bournemouth, England in 1950.

At 17, Armstrong began programming in Fortran on his local council's mainframe.
 
Armstrong graduated with a B.Sc. in Physics from University College London in 1972.

He received a Ph.D. in Computer Science from the Royal Institute of Technology (KTH) in Stockholm, Sweden in 2003. His dissertation was titled Making reliable distributed systems in the presence of software errors. He was a professor at KTH from 2014 until his death.

Career

After briefly working for Donald Michie at the University of Edinburgh, Armstrong moved to Sweden in 1974 and joined the  Ericsson Computer Science Lab at Kista in 1984.

Peter Seibel wrote:
Originally a physicist, he switched to computer science when he ran out of money in the middle of his physics PhD and landed a job as a researcher working for Donald Michie—one of the founders of the field of artificial intelligence in Britain. At Michie's lab, Armstrong was exposed to the full range of AI goodies, becoming a founding member of the British Robotics Association and writing papers about robotic vision.

When funding for AI dried up as a result of the famous Lighthill report, it was back to physics-related programming for more than half a decade, first at the EISCAT scientific association and later the Swedish Space Corporation, before finally joining the  Ericsson Computer Science Lab, where he invented Erlang.

It was at Ericsson in 1986, that he worked with Robert Virding and Mike Williams, to invent the Erlang programming language, which was released as open source in 1998.

Personal life

Armstrong married Helen Taylor in 1977. They had two children, Thomas and Claire.

Death

Armstrong died on 20 April 2019 from an infection which was complicated by pulmonary fibrosis.

Publications
 2007. Programming Erlang: Software for a Concurrent World. Pragmatic Bookshelf .
 2013. Programming Erlang: Software for a Concurrent World. Second edition. Pragmatic Bookshelf .

References

External links 
 Erlang and other stuff - Joe Armstrong's current blog
 Armstrong on Software - Joe Armstrong's old weblog
 Joseph Leslie Armstrong - Prof. Armstrong's home page at KTH
 Joe Armstrong home page at the Swedish Institute of Computer Science

1950 births
2019 deaths
British computer programmers
British computer scientists
Programming language designers
Free software programmers
Computer programmers
Erlang (programming language)
KTH Royal Institute of Technology alumni
Scientists from Bournemouth
British expatriates in Sweden